Navagraha are nine heavenly bodies and deities that influence human life on Earth according to Hinduism and Hindu astrology. The term is derived from nava ( "nine") and graha ( "planet, seizing, laying hold of, holding"). The nine parts of the Navagraha are the Sun, Moon, planets Mercury, Venus, Mars, Jupiter and Saturn, and the two nodes of the Moon. 

The term planet was applied originally only to the five planets known (i.e., visible to the naked eye) and excluded Earth. The term was later generalized, particularly during the Middle Ages, to include the sun and the moon (sometimes referred to as "lights"), making a total of seven planets. The seven days of the week of the Hindu calendar also correspond with the seven classical planets and related day names of European culture, and are named accordingly in most languages of the Indian subcontinent. Most Hindu temples around the world have a designated place dedicated to  worship of Navagraha.

Planets, celestial bodies and lunar nodes

Music 
Muthuswami Dikshitar (1776..1835), a Carnatic music composer from southern India composed the Navagraha Kritis in praise of the nine grahas. Each song is a prayer to one of the nine planets. The sahitya (lyrics) of the songs reflect a profound knowledge of the mantra and jyotisha sastras.

See also

 Jyotisha
 Nakshatra
 Saptarishi
 List of Hindu deities
 List of Hindu pilgrimage sites
 List of Navagraha temples
 List of Natchathara temples
 List of Hindu temples
 Planets in astrology

Notes

 
Hindu astronomy
Technical factors of Hindu astrology